Albert Canal Bartrina (born 10 July 1991) is a Spanish professional footballer who plays as a central defender for Hong Kong Premier League club Resources Capital.

Club career
Born in Olot, Girona, Catalonia, Canal began his senior career with UE Llagostera in the Tercera División, helping them to promote to Segunda División B for the first time ever in his only season. In December 2010 he signed with neighbours RCD Espanyol, being assigned to the reserves in the third tier.

Canal made his first-team debut on 13 December 2011, coming on as an 82nd-minute substitute for fellow youth graduate Víctor Álvarez in a Copa del Rey match against RC Celta de Vigo (0–0 away draw, 4–2 aggregate). He continued appearing exclusively for the B team until his release in June 2013, also serving a short loan at his first club, now in division three.

Canal continued competing in the lower leagues and amateur football the following years, with UE Olot, AEC Manlleu, UE Figueres and CF Peralada; all the sides hailed from his native region. In October 2020, the 29-year-old moved abroad and joined Resources Capital FC in the Hong Kong Premier League.

References

External links

1991 births
Living people
People from Olot
Sportspeople from the Province of Girona
Spanish footballers
Footballers from Catalonia
Association football defenders
Segunda División B players
Tercera División players
UE Costa Brava players
RCD Espanyol B footballers
RCD Espanyol footballers
UE Olot players
AEC Manlleu footballers
UE Figueres footballers
CF Peralada players
Hong Kong Premier League players
Resources Capital FC players
Spanish expatriate footballers
Expatriate footballers in Hong Kong
Spanish expatriate sportspeople in Hong Kong